Electrogenic sodium bicarbonate cotransporter 1, sodium bicarbonate cotransporter is a membrane transport protein that in humans is encoded by the SLC4A4 gene.

Function 

Sodium bicarbonate cotransporters (NBCs) mediate the coupled movement of sodium and bicarbonate ions across the plasma membrane of many cells. This is an electrogenic process with an apparent stoichiometry of 3 bicarbonate ions per sodium ion. Sodium bicarbonate co-transport is involved in bicarbonate secretion/absorption and intracellular pH regulation. Romero and Boron (1999) reviewed NBCs. Soleimani and Burnham (2000) reviewed NBCs and their regulation in physiologic and pathophysiologic states.[supplied by OMIM]

Clinical significance 

In the brain, the sodium bicarbonate transporter is predominantly expressed by astrocytes. They may participate in regulation of brain extracellular space  pH. Some mutations in the gene have been associated with familial hemiplegic migraine. Other mutations disrupt kidney bicarbonate transport and cause proximal renal tubular acidosis.

Splice variants

NBCe1-A aka kNBC1 (mainly expressed in the kidney)

NBCe1-B aka pNBC1 (expressed in the pancreas and elsewhere)

NBCe1-C (expressed in the brain)

Distribution 

The renal SLC4A4 gene product NBCe1-A is specifically expressed in the basolateral membranes of proximal tubule epithelia.

See also 
 Solute carrier family

References

Further reading

Solute carrier family